The Wright-Elmwood Tract (alternately referred to as the Wright Tract or the Elmwood Tract) is an island in the Sacramento–San Joaquin River Delta. It is part of San Joaquin County, California, and managed by Reclamation District 2119.

References

Islands of San Joaquin County, California
Islands of the Sacramento–San Joaquin River Delta
Islands of Northern California